Dieter Murmann (12 May 1934 – 8 December 2021) was a German social market lobbyist. A member of the Christian Democratic Union of Germany, he served as Chairman of the Economic Council Germany from 1989 to 2000.

References

1934 births
2021 deaths
Christian Democratic Union of Germany politicians
People from Dortmund